John Matheson Molesworth (16 February 1878 – 27 August 1942) was an Australian rules footballer who played with St Kilda in the Victorian Football League (VFL).

References

External links 

1878 births
1942 deaths
Australian rules footballers from Victoria (Australia)
St Kilda Football Club players